Economy Candy is a candy store in the Lower East Side New York City. It was established in 1937. The managers are the Cohen family.

Serious Eats described Economy Candy as the craziest and best candy store in New York City.

The store celebrated its 85th anniversary in July 2022.

Economy Candy stocks many branded candies, including older brands which are difficult to find elsewhere.

The Cohen family who owns the store also has a history of themselves working at the store.

In February 2023 the store announced its first expansion location, which will be in the Chelsea Market.

References

External links

Confectionery stores
Lower East Side
American companies established in 1937
Food and drink companies established in 1937
Confectionery companies of the United States